Baruch may refer to:

People 
 Baruch (given name), a given name of Hebrew origin
 Baruch Spinoza (1632–1677), Dutch philosopher
 Belle W. Baruch (1899–1964), American heiress, daughter of Bernard Baruch
 Bernard Baruch (1870–1965), American financier, stock market speculator, statesman, and presidential advisor
 Bertha Hirsch Baruch (1876–?), American writer and suffragette
 Dorothy Walter Baruch (1899–1962), American psychologist and children's book writer
 Franzisca Baruch (1901-1989) German-Israeli graphic designer
 Ruth-Marion Baruch (1922–1997), American photographer
 Yaakov Baruch (1982), Indonesian rabbi

Other uses 
 Book of Baruch or 1 Baruch, a deuterocanonical book, considered by Jews and most Protestants to be apocryphal
 2 Baruch, also called the Syriac Apocalypse of Baruch
 3 Baruch, also called the Greek Apocalypse of Baruch
 4 Baruch, also known as the Paraleipomena of Jeremiah
 Baruch College, part of the City University of New York system, named after Bernard Baruch
 Baruch Plan, a proposed U.S. atomic energy plan following World War II by Bernard Baruch